Jordy Hiwula-Mayifuila, known as Jordy Hiwula (born 21 September 1994) is an English professional footballer who plays as a striker for Scottish Premiership club Ross County. He also represented the England U19 side.

Club career
Hiwula joined a local club, Fletcher Moss Rangers, from there he went onto Manchester City. After missing most of the 2012–13 season with a serious ligament injury Hiwula scored 20 goals in 31 games for Manchester City's Under-21 side in 2013–14 season. As a result, Hiwula extended his contract, on a two-year deal, keeping him until 2016.

Loan spells
On 2 October 2014, he joined Yeovil Town on loan until 5 January 2015. He made his professional debut on 4 October in Yeovil's 2–0 defeat against Milton Keynes Dons. On 8 November 2014, Hiwula scored his first goal for Yeovil with the only goal of the game in the FA Cup first round against Crawley Town. Hiwula returned to Manchester City, on 25 November 2014, having only scored one goal in his nine appearances in his time at Yeovil.

On 2 February 2015, Hiwula signed for League One side Walsall on an initial one-month youth loan. He scored three minutes into his debut for the Saddlers after coming on 66 minutes in to a 2–0 away win against Doncaster on 7 February 2015. His second goal came just three days later, on his home début against Rochdale, where he scored what turned out to be the winner to put Walsall 3–0 up in an eventual 3–2 win. After scoring three times in six appearances, Hiwula's loan spell was extended for another month. Hiwula scored his fourth goal on 3 March 2015, in a 1–0 win against his former club Yeovil Town. Hiwula played in the final of the Football League Trophy at Wembley, coming on as a substitute for Tom Bradshaw in the 62nd minute in a 2–0 loss against Bristol City. Hiwula's loan spell with Walsall was extended until the end of the season. Hiwula went on to score five more goals in the 2014/15 season, including braces against Crawley Town and Bristol City.

Huddersfield Town
On 17 July 2015, Hiwula signed for Championship side Huddersfield Town on a three-year contract for an undisclosed fee. After being an un-used substitute in the opening game of the season against Hull City, Hiwula made his Huddersfield Town debut, coming on as a substitute for Tommy Smith in the 65th minute of a 2–1 loss against Notts County in the first round of League Cup.

Wigan Athletic (loan)
On 27 August 2015, Hiwula joined Football League One side Wigan Athletic on a season long loan, in a move which saw Emyr Huws move the other way on similar terms. On his second appearance for Wigan he scored a late winner against Chesterfield. On 1 February 2016, Hiwula was recalled early from his loan spell at Wigan.

Walsall (loan)
On 4 March 2016, it was announced that Hiwula had re-joined Walsall on loan until the end of the 2015/2016 season.

Bradford City (loan)
He moved on a season long loan to Bradford City in July 2016.

Fleetwood Town (loan)
On 5 July 2017 Hiwula joined League One Fleetwood Town on loan for the 2016–17 season. He scored his first goal for Fleetwood in a 2-1 EFL Cup defeat against Carlisle United on 8 August 2017.

Coventry City
On 2 August 2018, Hiwula signed for League One club Coventry City on a two-year deal for an undisclosed fee. He scored his first goal for Coventry against Forest Green Rovers in the EFL Trophy, a game which the sky blues won on penalties following a 1–1 draw. His first league goal came on 20 October against Southend United. He scored in the next two games, helping Coventry to beat Bradford City and Doncaster Rovers.

Portsmouth
In October 2020, Hiwula signed on a short-term deal for Portsmouth after being released from Coventry City at the end of last season. He scored his first goal for Portsmouth in a 6-1 FA Cup win against King's Lynn Town on 28 November 2020. On 6 January 2021, Hiwula signed a contract extension to remain at the club until the end of the 2020/21 season.

Doncaster Rovers
On 10 July 2021, Hiwula joined League One side Doncaster Rovers on a two-year deal.

Ross County
On 28 June 2022, Hiwula joined Scottish Premiership side Ross County for a nominal fee, signing a two-year deal with the club.

International career
Hiwula has represented England at U18 level, scoring once in a 3–0 win against Poland, and at U19 level, where he scored on his debut against Estonia.

Personal life
Hiwula was born in England and is of Angolan descent. Hiwula is a Manchester United fan and his school nickname was Deckchair.

Career statistics

Honours
Portsmouth
EFL Trophy runner-up: 2019–20

References

External links

1994 births
Living people
Footballers from Manchester
English footballers
England youth international footballers
Association football forwards
Fletcher Moss Rangers F.C. players
Manchester City F.C. players
Yeovil Town F.C. players
Walsall F.C. players
Huddersfield Town A.F.C. players
Bradford City A.F.C. players
Wigan Athletic F.C. players
Fleetwood Town F.C. players
Coventry City F.C. players
Portsmouth F.C. players
Doncaster Rovers F.C. players
Ross County F.C. players
English Football League players
English people of Angolan descent
Scottish Professional Football League players